The 1998 IAAF World Road Relay Championships was the fourth and final edition of the global, international marathon relay competition, organised by the International Association of Athletics Federations (IAAF). The event took place on 18–19 April in Manaus, Brazil with the participation of 222 athletes from 28 nations. The women's race took place on Saturday 18 April, starting at 9:00 AM Amazon Standard Time, and featured twelve national teams comprising a total 72 athletes. The men's race took place on Sunday 19 April, also starting at 9:00 AM Amazon Standard Time, and featured 25 national teams comprising a total 150 athletes.

Each national team consisted of six athletes, who alternately covered six stages to complete the 42.195 km marathon distance. The first, third and fifth stages were of 5 km, the second and fourth stages were of 10 km, and the final stage covered the remaining 7.195 km. Rather than using the traditional baton associated with relay races, athletes passed a wrist band to their compatriots at end of each leg. Prize money totalling US$420,000 was awarded to the athletes of the medal-winning teams: $120,000 for the winning team, $60,000 for the silver medallists and $30,000 for third place, with the winnings split evenly between the team's six athletes.

The Ethiopian and Kenyan teams took the top two spots in both races, with the Ethiopian women being victorious in a time of 2:21:15 hours and the Kenyan men coming out on top in a time of 2:01:13 hours. These represented two title defences, as both teams won those races at the previous edition in 1996. Romania took the bronze medals in the women's race and the host nation, Brazil, came third in the men's race – the second time it reached the podium after being men's runners-up at the 1996 championships.

Race summary
The women's race took place in difficult weather conditions, with high humidity and a temperature around 34 degrees Celsius (93° Fahrenheit). Kenya's Jackline Maranga led the pack in the first stage at 15:39 minutes, with Ethiopia's Yimenashu Taye 19 seconds in arrears and Japan's Takako Kotorida another 20 seconds back. On the second leg Gete Wami overhauled Kenya's Jane Omoro to put Ethiopia in first place, while Alina Tecuţă had the second fastest time to bring Romania into third place. Ethiopia extended its lead in the third leg through stage winner Genet Gebregiorgis and Miyo Nakano brought Japan to third again.

A strong leg four by Cristina Pomacu returned Romania to third place and Alla Zhilyaeva won the stage to bring Russia back up the ranks. Ayelech Worku cemented Ethiopia's lead by completing the fifth stage eleven seconds faster than Kenya's Naomi Mugo, now over a minute behind, while Romania's Constantina Diță pulled further away from fourth-placed Japan. Kenya's Sally Barsosio attempted to close down Ethiopia's Merima Denboba in the final leg, but was unable to do so, finishing over half a minute behind the Ethiopian despite her leg of 24:09 minutes. The conditions severely affected some of the teams: Russia trailed by three and a half minutes in the first leg due to Yelena Motalova struggling, Mexico's Judith Ramirez took nearly seven minutes longer than Russia's Zhilyaeva to finish her 10K fourth leg, and Ecuador's Sara Nivisela took nearly four minutes longer to complete the 5-kilometre fifth leg than did Ethiopia's Ayelech Worku.

The following morning, the weather conditions proved a little more amenable to the male runners, with humidity dropping to 85% and the temperature falling to 28 degrees Celsius (82° Fahrenheit). John Kibowen led off the Kenyan team as front runner and was narrowly edged out by Ethiopia's Million Wolde in the first stage, with both recording 13:44 minutes for the 5 km, and a battle for third emerged between Brazil's Elenilson da Silva and Portugal's Hélder Ornelas some 15 seconds adrift. Stage two saw Kenya emerge as clear leaders as Paul Koech gained 49 seconds on his Ethiopian rival Ayele Mezgebu. Behind them, Japan's Tomoaki Kunichika pulled level Alberto Maravilha (Portugal) and Tomix da Costa (Brazil) in the chase for third as the athletes neared the mid-point. 

Benjamin Limo completed the fourth leg 24 seconds faster than the rest of the field to keep Kenya's lead. Brazil's Ronaldo da Costa gained a ten-second gap in third, with Japan (Masatoshi Ibata) and Portugal (Angelo Pacheco) both slowing in fourth and fifth. Tom Nyariki made it three consecutive stage wins for Kenya in the fifth leg, gaining over 40 seconds over second placed Ethiopian Tesfaye Tolla. Elijah Mutandiko's 33-minute 10K leg (second fastest of the stage) brought Zimbabwe into fifth place, as Portugal fell back. Ethiopia rallied in the fifth stage with Fita Bayisa running 5 km in 14:16 minutes to draw nearer to Kenya's John Kosgei. A poor run from Ethiopia's Alene Emere saw Kenyan Paul Malakwen Kosgei ease to victory with over two and a half minutes to spare. Consistentcy saw Brazil claim third place, with Sergio Goncalves da Silva finishing around a minute after the Ethiopian. Zimbabwe's Abel Chimukoko had the second fastest time of the final stage, which saw his mostly-barefooted team overhaul Japan for fourth place by a margin of three seconds. Denmark's Jorgen Gamborg failed to complete his last leg – the only athlete at the competition to do so – meaning his team was eliminated.

Medal summary

Results

Men's race
Key:

Women's race
Key:

Participation

References

1998
World Road Relay Championships
World Road Relay Championships
World Road Relay Championships
April 1998 sports events in South America
International sports competitions in Manaus
International athletics competitions hosted by Brazil
Marathons in Brazil